Lightning Bolt is the debut album by noise rock band Lightning Bolt. Originally, five of the tracks on the album were recorded in the studio, however, with the exception of one track, the band discarded these and instead put low fidelity live versions of the songs on the record. A 50-minute "companion cassette" entitled Zone was available for three dollars via direct mail order when the record was originally released. This material appears in the form of two bonus tracks included on the CD release.

The original vinyl issue was limited to 750 copies and had the artwork that is represented on this page. The more common CD reissue contained slightly different artwork.

Track listing

Album personnel
 Brian Chippendale – drums and vocals
 Brian Gibson – bass guitar
 Rik Peltier – recording engineer

References

External links
 Lightning Bolt official website
 Lightning Bolt at Load Records

Lightning Bolt (band) albums
1999 debut albums
Load Records albums